The enzyme phosphosulfolactate synthase (EC 4.4.1.19) catalyzes the reaction

(2R)-2-O-phospho-3-sulfolactate  phosphoenolpyruvate + sulfite

This enzyme belongs to the family of lyases, specifically the class of carbon-sulfur lyases.  The systematic name of this enzyme class is (2R)-2-O-phospho-3-sulfolactate hydrogen-sulfite-lyase (phosphoenolpyruvate-forming). Other names in common use include (2R)-phospho-3-sulfolactate synthase, and (2R)-O-phospho-3-sulfolactate sulfo-lyase.

Structural studies

As of late 2007, only one structure has been solved for this class of enzymes, with the PDB accession code .

References

 

EC 4.4.1
Enzymes of known structure